Guillermo Durán and Horacio Zeballos were the defending champions but chose not to participate.

Brian Baker and Ryan Harrison won the title, defeating Purav Raja and Divij Sharan 5–7, 7–6(7–4), [10–8] in the final.

Seeds

Draw

References
 Main Draw
 Qualifying Draw

Savannah Challenger - Doubles